Glyphipterix nigromarginata is a species of sedge moth in the genus Glyphipterix. It was described by Syuti Issiki in 1930. It is found in Japan.

The wingspan is 11–13 mm.

References

Moths described in 1930
Glyphipterigidae
Moths of Japan